Metamorfosi is the sixth studio album by Italian singer Noemi, released on 5 March 2021 by Sony Music. 
It was produced by Muut—the duo composed of Francesco Fugazza and Marcello Grilli—and Andrea Rigonat, except for the track "Glicine", produced by Dario Faini. Faini also appears as a songwriter, along with, among others, previous collaborators Federica Abbate and Roberto Casalino, and several composers and lyricists she had never worked with before, including Neffa, Franco126, Ginevra Lubrano, Arashi and Mahmood, the latter of which appears under the pseudonym Tattroli.

According to Noemi, the renewal of the team allowed her to "abstract from her certainties" about her vocal style, as she wanted to "add some new colors" with the album. Her renditions were more subtle, with a less scratching voice and with reduced vocal ornaments.
Working with new sogwriters also helped Noemi to create a more contemporary record, as she previously did with Made in London, and to explore new sounds taken from the Italian underground scene, as well as from funky, soul and "retro pop".
Its title, literally meaning metamorphosis, reflects this musical change, as well as her personal path, which began when Noemi realized she had lost her love for herself and she felt "unfocused". She then struggled at working on herself to come out of a shell, until she evolved and took back the control of her life.
According to Noemi, the album cover―a black and white close-up of herself with a big smile on her face—reflects the moment in which "everything became clearer".

The album was launched during the 71st Sanremo Music Festival, in which Noemi competed with the set's lead single, "Glicine", placing 14th.
The song "Makumba", a duet with Carl Brave was released as a single in June 2021 and later added to the streaming version of the album. The song became one of the hits of the summer in Italy and received a triple platinum certification. In the meanwhile, Noemi performed live across Italy for her Metamorfosi Summer Tour, as part of the album's promotion.

Track listing

Charts and certifications

Weekly charts

Certifications

References

2021 albums
Noemi (singer) albums
Sony Music Italy albums
Italian-language albums